Institute is an unincorporated community on Highway 57 in the town of Sevastopol, Door County, Wisconsin.

Institute was named for a Roman Catholic boarding school that once stood there.

Town Hall
In 2009, a new town hall building on the south side of Institute was finished, located near the Sevastopol School District buildings and adjoining the Sevastopol Town Park.

Gallery

References

External links
Door County Map
Town's website

Unincorporated communities in Wisconsin
Unincorporated communities in Door County, Wisconsin